Progressive nodular histiocytosis is a cutaneous condition clinically characterized by the development of two types of skin lesions: superficial papules and deeper larger subcutaneous nodules.

See also 
 Non-X histiocytosis

References 

Monocyte- and macrophage-related cutaneous conditions